Muslim views on abortion are shaped by  Hadith (the words, actions, and the silent approval of the Islamic prophet Muhammad as transmitted through chains of narrators), as well as by the opinions of legal and religious scholars and commentators. The Quran does not directly address intentional abortion, leaving greater discretion to the laws of individual countries. Although opinions among Islamic scholars differ over when a pregnancy can be terminated, there are no explicit prohibitions on a woman's ability to abort under Islamic law. 

Each of the four Sunni Islam schools of thought—Hanafi, Shafi‘i, Hanbali and Maliki— have their own reservations on if and when abortions are permissible in Islam. The Maliki madhhab holds "that the fetus is ensouled at the moment of conception" and thus "most Malikis do not permit abortion at any point, seeing God's hand as actively forming the fetus at every stage of development." On the other hand, some Hanafi scholars believe that abortion before the hundred twenty day period is over is permitted, though some Hanafi scholars teach that an abortion within 120 days is makruh (disapproved, i.e. discouraged). All Islamic schools of thought agree abortion is recommended when the mother's life is in danger,  because the mother's life is paramount. Sahih al-Bukhari (book of Hadith) writes that the fetus is believed to become a living soul after 120 days' gestation.

In Shia Islam, abortion is "forbidden after implantation of the fertilised ovum." The leader of the Iranian Islamic Revolution,  Ayatollah Khomeini declared that  shari'a forbids  abortion 
without any reason "even at the earliest possible stage". a position shared by other  Shiite scholars.

American academic Azizah Y. al-Hibri claims that "the majority of Muslim scholars permit abortion, although they differ on the stage of fetal development beyond which it becomes prohibited." According to Sherman Jackson, "while abortion, even during the first trimester, is forbidden according to a minority of jurists, it is not held to be an offense for which there are criminal or even civil sanctions."

In the 47 countries of the world with Muslim-majority populations, access to abortion varies greatly. In all, abortion is allowed when the mother's life is at risk. In 18 of the countries, including Iraq, Egypt and Indonesia, this is the only circumstance where abortion is  permitted. In another ten countries it is allowed on request. In still others, abortion is permitted under certain  circumstances besides  preserving the mother's life, such as preserving her mental health, cases of
foetal impairment,  incest or rape, and social or economic reasons.

History 
A majority of scholars during the medieval age viewed 120 days after conception as a crucial dividing line in the development of the fetus -- the time when the fetus became "ensouled" (becomes a living soul),  and thus a live human being.
Abortion before this point was  permissible, according to Islamic law scholar Abed Awad, but afterwards a termination of life.
These views towards abortion are still referenced and used by several modern Islamic theologians and scholars. 

According to religious studies scholar Zahra Ayubi,  historically Muslim thought was more concerned with the topic of preservation of human life and safeguarding of the mother's life,  than determining when life begins.  Several contemporary Muslim writers have also stated that premodern Islamic scholars were more tolerant on abortion.

The controversial Hanbali jurist Ibn Taymiyyah stated in his fatwa collection Fatawa Ibn Taymiyyah, "Aborting a fetus has been declared unlawful (haram) with the consensus of all the Muslim scholars. It is similar to burying an infant alive as referred to by Allah Almighty in the verse of the Qur’an: 'And when the female infant, buried alive, will be asked as to what crime she was killed for' (Surah al-Takwir, verse 8)".

Hadith and abortion

There were no medical abortions in the time of Muhammad, the Prophet of Islam, but a number of Hadith  deal with situations where a pregnant woman lost an unborn child, often by being struck in the belly.  

In at least the Hadith mentioned below (all are "sound" Hadith of Sunni Islam), Muhammad, would declare the proper  diya (monetary compensation in Islamic law for bodily harm or property damage) for the woman's loss.   In each case the compensation was a slave, thus indicating that the value of an unborn child was another human being.

Relevant excerpts

Abortion in various schools of thought

Ensoulment
In Sunni Islam, the period when a fetus becomes ensouled can vary within the same madhab even if consensus exists. 
120 days after conception. The Hanafi, Shi'is, Zaydi and some Shafi schools view the fetus as being ensouled at 120 days. 
80 days. However, other Shafi schools set the ensoulment stage of a fetus at 80 days. 
40 days. In the Maliki and Hanbali school of thought, ensoulment is placed at 40 days. 
 Conception. The Ibadi position states that a fetus becomes ensouled right at the time of conception.

Other factors
Most schools consider abortion permissible if the pregnancy poses a physical or psychological harm to the mother.  Socio-economic factors or the presence of fetal anomalies is also viewed as justifiable reasons to abort in many schools. However, Islamic jurists in all schools state that abortion is permissible even after the ensoulment stage of a fetus if the mother's life is in danger.

When abortion is permissible
Among Muslims, the permissibility of abortion depends on factors such as time and extenuating circumstances. 

In Shia Islam, abortion is "forbidden after implantation of the fertilised ovum." As with other Shiite scholars, Ayatollah Khomeini declared that "Termination of pregnancy even at the earliest possible stage under normal circumstances without any reason is not allowed" and that "The shari'a does not permit the abortion of a fetus." 

The four Sunni schools of thought have differing perspectives in which parts of gestation where abortion is permissible. It is important to note that Malikites do not permit abortion in any of the stages of gestation.

Before four months of gestation
Sayyid al-Sabiq, author of Fiqh al-Sunnah, has summarized the views of the classical jurists in this regard in the following words:

Stage 1 Nutfa (Sperm)

This is the stage from conception to 40 days since the semen has fertilized the ovum. In this stage, Hanafites permit abortions, the majority of Shafites permit abortions, some Hanbalites permit it, but Malikites do not.

Among contemporary Sunni scholars, Yasir Qadhi states that abortion may be performed within the first 40 days of pregnancy "for a very legitimate reason", but is prohibited after that period, at which point ensoulment occurs.

Stage 2 Alaqa (Blood Clot) 

This is the stage 40-80 days after conception when the fertilized egg has become blood clot-like. In this stage, Hanafites permit abortions, while only some Shafites and Hanbalites permit it.

Stage 3 Mudgha (Embryo) 

This is the stage 80-120 days after conception where the blood clot has now formed into flesh. In this stage, Hanafites permit abortions, only some Shafites and Hanbalites permit it. 

Stage 4 Khalqan Akhar (Spirit) 

This is the stage 120 days after conception when based on Islam a soul/spirit has entered the body. In this stage none of the four schools of thought permit abortions.

Threat to the woman's life
On the issue of the life of the woman, Muslims universally agree that her life takes precedence over the life of the fetus. This is because the woman is considered the "original source of life," while the fetus is only "potential" life. Muslim jurists agree that abortion is allowed based on the principle that "the greater evil [the woman's death] should be warded off by the lesser evil [abortion]." In these cases the physician is considered a better judge than the scholar.

According to the Twelvers, there is consensus among ayatollahs that abortion is allowed only when it is medically proven that the life of a mother is in danger. Other than that, before or after 120 days, abortion is always forbidden, no matter the circumstances (such as problems with the fetus or poverty, etc.).

Rape

Some Muslim scholars have held that the child of rape is a legitimate child and thus it would be sinful to kill this fetus. Scholars permit its abortion only if the fetus is less than four months old, or if it endangers the life of its mother.

Muslim scholars were urged to make exceptions in the 1990s following the rape of Bosnian and Albanian women by Serb soldiers. In 1991, the Grand Mufti of Palestine, Ekrima Sa'id Sabri took a different position than mainstream Muslim scholars. He ruled that Muslim women raped by their enemies during the Kosovo War could take abortifacient medicine, because otherwise the children born to those women might one day fight against Muslims.

Fetal deformity
Some Sunni Muslim scholars argue that abortion is permitted if the newborn might be sick in some way that would make its care exceptionally difficult for the parents (e.g. deformities, mental handicaps). Widely quoted is a resolution of the Saudi-led jurisprudence council of Mekkah Al Mukaramah (the Muslim World League) passing a fatwa in its 12th session held in February 1990. This allowed abortion if the fetus was grossly malformed with untreatable severe condition proved by medical investigations and decided upon by a committee formed by competent trustworthy physicians, and provided that abortion is requested by the parents and the foetus is less than 120 days computed from moment of conception.

Abortion in Islamic countries 
In all, there are 57 members in the Organization of Islamic Conference—an organisation of countries with Muslim majorities or pluralities. Most Muslim countries have restrictive abortion laws that permit abortions only when the life of the mother is threatened. Twelve members of the Organization of Islamic Conference allow unrestricted access to abortion. With the exception of Turkey and Tunisia, they are mainly former Soviet Bloc states. Bahrain, a politically and socially conservative Muslim state, is the 12th among these countries to permit unrestricted access to abortion. Among socially conservative Muslim countries, seven countries permit abortion in the first 4 months of gestation for fetal deformities, four countries in subSaharan Africa (Benin, Burkina Faso, Chad and Guinea) and three in the Middle East (Kuwait, Qatar and, now, Iran).

See also
 Ensoulment in Islam
Islamic feminism

References

Religion and abortion
Islam and women